Anna Parker Fessenden (April 8, 1896 – May 3, 1972) was an American botanist and mathematics educator.

Early life and education 
Anna Parker Fessenden was born in Thomaston, Maine, and raised in Mattapan, Massachusetts, the middle of three daughters of William S. Fessenden and Alida Mary Mehan Fessenden. Her mother was assistant principal of Sandwich High School.

Fessenden graduated from Girls' Latin School in 1914, and graduated from Smith College in 1918. As a college student, she was active in the Smith College Unitarian Club, and she edited and wrote for the Smith College Monthly. She earned a master's degree from the University of Minnesota in 1920. Her master's thesis, under advisor Josephine Tilden, was titled "Observations on Two Rare Australian Algae, Myriocladia Sciurus, Harvey and Bactrophora Irregularis, N. SP."

Career 
Fessenden taught botany at Vassar College, Wellesley College and at the University of Minnesota. She and Josephine Tilden co-authored an article on brown algae from Australia. She taught mathematics at Needham High School in Massachusetts for 36 years, and was a director of math programs for the Needham school district. She retired from teaching in 1962.

Fessenden was an active member of several clubs including the Audubon Society, and a trustee of the Thomaston Historical Society.

Personal life 
Fessenden died in 1972, aged 76 years, in Camden, Maine. Her grave is with her parents' graves, in Sandwich, Massachusetts.

References 

1896 births
1972 deaths
People from Thomaston, Maine
American botanists
American educators
Mathematics educators
People from Needham, Massachusetts
Smith College alumni
University of Minnesota alumni